Manfredi is a surname of Italian origin. The name may refer to:

People
 Manfredi family, a noble family, lords of Faenza, Italy
 Francesco I Manfredi (1260–1343), Lord of Faenza
 Astorre I Manfredi (1345–1405), condottiero, founder of the Compagnia della Stella
 Astorre II Manfredi (1412–1468), Lord of Faenza
 Galeotto Manfredi (1440–1888), Italian condottiero, Lord of Faenza.
 Carlo II Manfredi (1439–1484), Lord of Faenza
 Astorre III Manfredi (1485–1502), Lord of Faenza
 Manfredi (1232–1266), King of Sicily
 Andrea Manfredi (1992–2018), Italian cyclist
 Barbara Manfredi (1444–1466), Italian wife of Pino III Ordelaffi, lord of Forlì
 Bartolomeo Manfredi (1582–1622), Italian painter; a leading member of the Caravaggisti
 Christopher Manfredi (contemporary), Canadian professor of political science
 Ercole Manfredi (1883–1973), Italian architect who worked in Siam (Thailand)
 Eustachio Manfredi (1674–1739), Italian mathematician, astronomer and poet
 Fabrizio Manfredi (b. 1967), Italian voice actor and dubbing director
 Gabriele Manfredi (1681–1761), Italian mathematician
 Gaetano Manfredi (b. 1964), Italian teacher and politician
 Gianfranco Manfredi (b. 1948), Italian singer-songwriter, author, actor and cartoonist
 Girolamo Manfredi (1430–1493), Italian philosopher, physician, and astronomer
 Giuseppe Manfredi (1828–1918), Italian professor, jurist, and politician
 Giuseppe Manfredi (admiral) (1897–1979), Italian admiral in the Regia Marina 
 Guidantonio Manfredi (1407–1448), Italian condottiero, Lord of Faenza
 Isabella Manfredi ((b. 1987), Australian singer-songwriter and lead singer of the Preatures
 Juan J. Manfredi (b. 1957), mathematician
 Kevin Manfredi (b. 1995), Italian Grand Prix motorcycle racer
 Laurence Manfredi (b. 1974), French Olympic shot putter
 Manfredo Manfredi (1859–1927), Italian architect
 Manfred I of Turin (b. 1000), second Arduinici marquis of Susa from 977 until his death
 Ulric Manfred II of Turin (died 1041), count of Turin and marquis of Susa in the early 11th century
 Marco Manfredi (b. 1997), Italian rugby union player
 Maria Florencia Manfredi (b. 1982), Argentine equestrian athlete
 Matt Manfredi, American screenwriter
 Nino Manfredi (1921–2004), Italian actor
 Taddeo Manfredi (1431–1486), Italian Lord of Imola, from 1448 until 1473
 Valerio Massimo Manfredi (b. 1942), Italian architect and historian

Fictional characters
 Kate Manfredi, character in the Australian television series McLeod's Daughters

Italian-language surnames